Fermented sausage, or dry sausage, is a type of sausage that is created by salting chopped or ground meat to remove moisture, while allowing beneficial bacteria to break down sugars into flavorful molecules.  Bacteria, including Lactobacillus species and Leuconostoc species, break down these sugars to produce lactic acid, which not only affects the flavor of the sausage, but also lowers the pH from 6.0 to 4.5–5.0, preventing the growth of bacteria that could spoil the sausage.  These effects are magnified during the drying process, as the salt and acidity are concentrated as moisture is extracted.

The ingredients found in a fermented sausage include meat, fat, bacterial culture, salt, spices, sugar and nitrite.  Nitrite is commonly added to fermented sausages to prevent the formation of botulism-causing bacteria, while some traditional and artisanal producers avoid nitrites.  Sugar is added to aid the bacterial production of lactic acid during the 18-hour to three-day fermentation process; the fermentation time depends on the temperature at which the sausage is stored: the lower the temperature, the longer the required fermentation period.  A white mold and yeast sometimes adheres to the outside of the sausage during the drying process.  This mold adds to the flavor of the sausage and aids in preventing harmful bacteria from attaching to the sausage.

The two main types of fermented sausage are the dry, salted, spiced sausages found in warmer climates and fermented semidry sausages found in cooler, more humid climates.   Since the dry sausages of the Mediterranean, in countries such as Italy, Spain, and Portugal contain 25–35% water and more than 4% salt, they may be stored at room temperature.  The sausages of northern Europe usually contain less salt (around 3%) and 40–50% water, and as such do not dry well in the humid climate of countries such as Germany.

See also 
 Charcuterie
 Sausage
 List of sausages

Notes

References
 McGee, Harold. On Food and Cooking: The Science and Lore of the Kitchen. New York: Simon and Schuster, 2004. .